Tasmalı (also, Tasmaly and Tasmanly) is a village and municipality in the Qakh Rayon of Azerbaijan.  It has a population of 1,468.

References 

Populated places in Qakh District